The 1925 Saskatchewan general election was held on June 2, 1925 to elect members of the Legislative Assembly of Saskatchewan.

The Liberal Party of Saskatchewan – under its new leader, Charles A. Dunning – won its sixth consecutive victory, and continued to dominate the legislature.

The Progressive Party of Saskatchewan increased its share of the vote from 7.5% to over 23%, but failed to add to its six member caucus.

The Conservative Party of James Anderson also increased its vote by over 14%, but only increased its representation in the legislature from two to three members.

The increase in the Progressive and Conservative vote came from voters who had supported independent candidates in the 1921 election.

Results

Note:* Party did not nominate candidates in previous election.

Percentages

Members elected
For complete electoral history, see individual districts

July 21, 1925
For complete electoral history, see individual districts

See also
List of Saskatchewan political parties
List of Saskatchewan provincial electoral districts

References
Saskatchewan Archives Board – Election Results By Electoral Division
Elections Saskatchewan - Provincial Vote Summaries

Further reading
 
 

1925 elections in Canada
1925 in Saskatchewan
1925
June 1925 events